The Bromelton Dam is an earth-fill embankment dam located off-stream at Gleneagle in the South East region of Queensland, Australia. The main purpose of the dam is for potable water supply of the  area. The resultant reservoir is called Bromelton Offstream Storage.

Since its completion, Bromelton Offstream Storage delivered an additional  in water supply capacity, working in conjunction with Cedar Grove Weir and the Wyaralong Dam, that was completed in 2001, to improve the reliability of the Logan River Water Supply Scheme in drought conditions.

See also

List of dams in Queensland

References

External links
Queensland Water Infrastructure - Bromelton Offstream Storage

Dams in Queensland
Scenic Rim Region
Reservoirs in Queensland
Dams completed in 2008
2008 establishments in Australia